The 2019–20 Ranji Trophy was the 86th season of the Ranji Trophy, the premier first-class cricket tournament in India. It took place between December 2019 and March 2020. Chandigarh competed in the Ranji Trophy for the first time. Vidarbha were the defending champions.

In the opening round of fixtures, Vidarbha's Wasim Jaffer became the first cricketer to play in 150 matches in the Ranji Trophy. In January 2020, in the round seven match between Madhya Pradesh and Uttar Pradesh, Madhya Pradesh's Ravi Yadav became the first bowler to take a hat-trick in his first over on his debut in a first-class cricket match. On 12 February 2020, the Plate Group fixture between Chandigarh and Manipur was the 60,000th first-class cricket match to be played.

Ahead of the final round of group stage matches, Gujarat, Saurashtra and Andhra had qualified for the quarter-finals, with fourteen teams in contention for the remaining five places. Goa qualified from the Plate Group, after beating Mizoram inside two days. Following the final group stage games, Bengal from Group A, Karnataka from Group B, Jammu & Kashmir from Group C, and Odisha, also from Group C, had all qualified for the quarter-finals. Bengal, Gujarat, Karnataka and Saurashtra all progressed from the quarter-finals to the semi-finals of the tournament.

Bengal reached the final for the first time since the 2006–07 tournament, after beating Karnataka by 174 runs. Saurashtra beat Gujarat by 92 runs to advance to the final for the fourth time in the last eight seasons. The final finished in a draw, with Saurashtra winning their maiden title, with a lead in the first innings of the match.

Format
The tournament retained the same format as the previous edition of the competition. The tournament had four groups, with nine teams each in Groups A, B, and ten teams in Group C and the Plate Group. The top two teams from Group C and the top team in the Plate Group progressed to the quarter-finals of the tournament, along with the top five teams across Groups A and B. A neutral curator was appointed to select the wicket for each fixture.

In July 2019, the Board of Control for Cricket in India (BCCI) considered the use of the Decision Review System (DRS) for matches in the knockout section of the tournament. The BCCI agreed to use a "limited DRS" system, which does not use Hawk-Eye and UltraEdge.

Player transfers
The following player transfers were approved ahead of the season. The new team, Chandigarh, transferred few players from Punjab and Himachal Pradesh.

Teams
The teams were placed in the following groups, based on their performance from the previous edition. Chandigarh competed in the tournament for the first time.

Group A
 Andhra
 Bengal
 Delhi
 Gujarat
 Hyderabad
 Kerala
 Punjab
 Rajasthan
 Vidarbha

Group B
 Baroda
 Himachal Pradesh
 Karnataka
 Madhya Pradesh
 Mumbai
 Railways
 Saurashtra
 Tamil Nadu
 Uttar Pradesh

Group C
 Assam
 Chhattisgarh
 Haryana
 Jammu & Kashmir
 Jharkhand
 Maharashtra
 Odisha
 Services
 Tripura
 Uttarakhand

Plate Group
 Arunachal Pradesh
 Bihar
 Chandigarh
 Goa
 Manipur
 Meghalaya
 Mizoram
 Nagaland
 Pondicherry
 Sikkim

League stage

Group A

Group B

Group C

Plate Group

Knockout stage

Quarter-finals

Semi-finals

Final

References

External links
 Series home at ESPN Cricinfo

Ranji Trophy seasons
Ranji Trophy Trophy
Ranji Trophy
Ranji Trophy